McGarrity is a surname. Notable people with the surname include:

John McGarrity (1925–2006), Scottish footballer
Joseph McGarrity (1874–1940), Irish Republican
Kevin McGarrity (born 1973), Northern Irish racing driver
Mark C. McGarrity (1943–2002), better known by his pen name Bartholomew Gill, American writer
Michael McGarrity (born 1939), American writer
Tom McGarrity (1922–1999), Scottish footballer